Isham Nicholas Haynie was a lawyer, politician, soldier and officer in the Union Army during the American Civil War. He was colonel of the 48th Illinois Volunteer Infantry Regiment at the battles of Fort Donelson and Shiloh.

Early life
Haynie was born in Dover, Tennessee, later to become site of the battle of Fort Donelson, which Haynie would take part in. At a young age he moved to Illinois where he worked as a farmer before volunteering for service in the Mexican–American War. He was appointed first lieutenant of Illinois Volunteer Infantry. He was mustered out of volunteer services in 1848. Following the Mexican War, Haynie graduated from Kentucky Law School in 1852. Returning to Illinois, he served as a lawyer and Illinois Legislator. In 1860 Haynie was a presidential elector who voted for Stephen A. Douglas.

Civil war
On November 10, 1861, Haynie was appointed colonel of the 48th Illinois Infantry. Haynie's regiment was attached to the District of Cairo. When Ulysses S. Grant organized his expedition to Fort Henry, Haynie became part of William H. L. Wallace's brigade in John A. McClernand's division. He participated in the capture of Fort Henry.

Fort Donelson
A week later Haynie was involved in the investment of Fort Donelson. On February 13, a Confederate battery had been plaguing the Union position. McClernand order an assault on the battery despite orders not to bring on a general engagement. McClernand chose his 3rd Brigade under Colonel William R. Morrison to lead the attack. Morrison's brigade consisted of only two regiments and McClernand decided to temporarily attach Haynie's 48th Illinois to Morrison's brigade. As final preparations were made, Haynie realized he was now the ranking officer in the brigade. Morrison willingly consented stating it was no time to argue about rank. To that Haynie replied "Colonel, lets take it together." The two colonels led the men forward. Morrison was struck in the hip, taking him off the field and removing any command ambiguity between him and Haynie. The attack failed and the survivors returned to their lines. Colonel Leonard F. Ross was appointed the new permanent commander of Morrison's brigade and Haynie returned with his regiment to Wallace's brigade. McClernand and Grant were both eager to forget about the incident, but years later McClernand claimed to Haynie's son he wanted Haynie to lead the charge because he felt him an "abler soldier".

Shiloh
Following the reorganization of the Union Army following the Battle of Fort Donelson Haynie remained in command of his regiment but the brigade was now commanded by Colonel C. Carroll Marsh as W.H.L. Wallace was promoted to division command. During the fighting on April 6 around Shiloh Church, Haynie was struck in the left thigh and forced to turn over command of the regiment.

Later service
On November 29, 1862 Haynie was appointed Brigadier General of U.S. Volunteers pending the confirmation of the U.S. Senate. Meanwhile, having recovered from his Shiloh wound, he was appointed to command of the 1st Brigade, 3rd Division, XVII Corps. On March 4, 1863 his commission as Brigadier General expired having never been confirmed by the Senate. Haynie resigned from the army two days later on March 6.

Returning to Illinois he served as adjutant general of the Illinois State Militia.  Haynie died on May 22, 1868, in Springfield, Illinois.

See also
 William R. Morrison
 Fort Donelson Union order of battle
 Shiloh Union order of battle

References
 Cooling, Benjamin Franklin, The Campaign for Fort Donelson, U.S. National Park Service and Eastern National, 1999, .
 Eicher, John H., and David J. Eicher. Civil War High Commands. Stanford, CA: Stanford University Press, 2001. .
 Gott, Kendall D., Where the South Lost the War: An Analysis of the Fort Henry—Fort Donelson Campaign, February 1862, Stackpole books, 2003, .

1824 births
1868 deaths
Adjutants General of Illinois
American military personnel of the Mexican–American War
Burials at Oak Ridge Cemetery
People from Dover, Tennessee
People of Illinois in the American Civil War
Union Army colonels